Marzieh Shah-Daei is the Deputy Minister of Petroleum since 2017. As an Iranian engineer, she was the former Executive Director of National Petrochemical Company, as well as "Vice Minister of Petroleum on Petrochemical affairs" from 2016 to 2017.

References

Living people
Iranian women engineers
Iranian businesspeople
Iranian women in business
1962 births
University of Calgary alumni
Sharif University of Technology alumni
21st-century women engineers